Joseph Allison may refer to:
Joseph Allison (South African politician), South African (Boer) politician
Joseph Allison (Canadian politician) (died 1806), farmer and politician in Nova Scotia
Joe Allison (1924–2002), songwriter
Joe Allison (American football) (born 1970), former American football placekicker